Jeremy is a male given name of Hebrew origin. The name's meaning is "God will uplift" or "Yhwh will raise" in various biblical interpretations, as the name "Jeremy" is the diminutive, anglicized form of the Hebrew given name "Jeremiah," the given name of the major prophet (Jeremiah) of Judeo-Christian traditions and scripture. 

Notable people with the name include:

In arts and entertainment

Jeremy Beadle (1948–2008), English television presenter, writer and producer
Jeremy Bowen, Welsh journalist
Jeremy Brett (1933–1995), English actor
Jeremy Brock, actor and director
Jeremy Bulloch, English actor
Jez Butterworth, English playwright, screenwriter, and film director
Jeremy Camp, Christian musician
Jeremy Clarkson, English broadcaster
Jaz (Jeremy) Coleman, English musician
Jeremy (J.B.) Cummings, American Children's Book Author
Jeremy Davis, bassist for American rock band Paramore
Jeremy Deller, English artist
Jeremy Edwards, English television actor
Jeremy Fall, American editor in chief of Cliché Magazine
Jeremy Filsell, English pianist and composer
Jem Finer, English musician with The Pogues
Jeremy Gable, American playwright and game designer
Jeremy Hardy, English comedian
Jeremy Harrington, American YouTuber and voice actor 
Jeremy Healy, English singer and DJ
Jeremy Heywood, British Civil Servant
Jeremy Irons, English actor
Jeremy Jordan (singer, born 1973), American singer
Jeremy Jordan (actor, born 1984), American actor
Jeremy Kyle, English television presenter
Jeremy Latimore, Australian Rugby League player
 Jeremy Lau, known as Jer Lau (born 1992), Hong Kong singer and actor 
Jeremy Lee (chef), TV chef
Jeremy Lee (singer) (born 1995), Hong Kong singer, dancer, and actor
Jeremy Lloyd English sitcom writer
Jeremy London, American actor with twin actor Jason London
Jeremy McKinnon, vocalist for American metalcore band, A Day to Remember
Jeremy Northam, English film actor
Jeremy Paxman, English television presenter
Jeremy Piven, American actor
Jeremy Ray, Australian television presenter and video game reviewer
Jeremy Renner, American actor
Jeremy Rohmer, contestant of ANTM cycle 20
Jeremy Rowley, American actor
Jeremy Scahill, Oscar-nominated and two-time George Polk award-winning journalist
Jeremy Shada, American actor, notably as the voice of Finn the Human in Adventure Time and GingerBrave in Cookie Run: Kingdom
Jeremy Sinden, English actor
Jeremy Sisto, American actor, producer, and writer
Jeremy Soule, American composer
Jeremy Spake, English TV presenter
Jeremy Strong, American actor
Jeremy Suarez, American actor from The Bernie Mac Show
Jeremy Sumpter, American actor
Jeremy Taggart, percussionist for Canadian band Our Lady Peace
Jeremy Thomas, English writer and film producer
Jeremy Vine, English radio and television journalist and presenter
Jeremy Wade, English author and television presenter, host of River Monsters 
Jeremy Williams, British actor
Jeremy Ylvisaker, American Multi-instrumentalist
Jeremy Zerechak, American documentary filmmaker
Jeremy Fernandez (singer), American singer
Jeremy Zucker, American singer-songwriter, producer

In politics

Jeremy Browne, British Liberal Democrat MP (2005–2015)
Jeremy Corbyn, British Labour MP for Islington North (1983–) and former Leader of the Labour Party (2015–2020)
Jeremy Hunt,  British Conservative MP (2005–) and Secretary of State for Health (2012–2018)
Jeremy Hutchinson (politician) (born 1974), U.S. politician
Jeremy Purvis, Scottish Liberal Democrat MSP (2003–2011), Member of House of Lords (2013–)
Jeremy Thorpe, former British MP for North Devon (1959–79) and Leader of the Liberal Party (1967–76)
Jeremy Wright (politician), British Conservative MP (2005–)
Jeremy Quin (born 1968), British Conservative MP (2015-)
Jeremy Lefroy (born 1959), British Conservative MP (2010-2019)

In sports

Jeremy Abbott, American figure skater
Jeremy Affeldt, American baseball player
Jeremy Bleich, American-Israeli baseball player
Jeremy Bloom, American Olympic downhill skier
Jeremy Bordeleau, Canadian canoeist
Jeremy Burgess, Honda and Yamaha MotoGP team chief engineer
Jeremy Cameron, Australian football player
Jeremy Chinn (born 1998), American football player
Jeremy Clark (defensive back), American football player
Jeremy Clements (born 1985), American racing driver
Jeremy Combs (born 1995), basketball player for Israeli team Hapoel Ramat Gan Givatayim
Jeremy Cox (born 1996), American football player
Jeremy Guscott, English rugby player and commentator
Jeremy Hill, American football player
Jeremy Howe, Australian football player
Jeremy Kellem, American football player
Jeremy Lamb, American NBA Basketball Player
Jeremy Larsen, American mixed martial artist
Jeremy Lin, American NBA Basketball Player
Jeremy Lusk, freestyle motocross driver
Jeremy Maclin, American football player
Jérémy Mathieu, French football player
Jeremy Mayfield, American NASCAR driver
Jeremy McGovern, Australian football player
Jeremy McGrath, American dirt bike racer
Jeremy McKinney, American football player
Jeremy McNichols, American football player
Jeremy Pargo, American basketball player
Jeremy Reaves, American football player
Jeremy Reed, American baseball player
Jeremy Rees, professional lacrosse player
Jeremy Reingold, South African swimmer and rugby player
Jeremy Roenick, American ice hockey player
Jeremy Ruckert (born 2000), American football player
Jeremy Sharp, Australian football player
Jeremy Shockey, American football player
Jeremy Sochan (born 2003), Polish-American basketball player
Jeremy Sowers, American baseball player
Jeremy Sprinkle, American football player
Jeremy Toljan, German soccer player
Jeremy Tyler, American basketball player
Jeremy Vuolo, American soccer player
Jeremy Wariner, American track athlete
Jeremy Wilcox, Canadian volleyball player
Jeremy Whyte, Canadian Ice Hockey Player
Jeremy Williams, American player of Canadian football
Jeremy Wolf (born 1993), American-Israeli baseball player on the Israel National Baseball Team

In other fields
Jeremy Allaire, founder of Allaire Corporation
Jeremy Bamber, English multiple murderer
Jeremy Bentham, English legal reformer and philosopher
Jeremy Curl, English explorer
Jeremy Dear, English journalist and union leader
Jeremy J. Smith, British philologist
Jeremy Hutchinson, Baron Hutchinson of Lullington (born 1915), British lawyer
Jeremy Leggett, English environmentalist
Jeremy Peat, Scottish economist and a Governor of the BBC
Jeremy Rosen, English rabbi
Jeremy Taylor, author and clergyman
Jeremy Fernandez, Malaysian-Australian TV presenter

Fictional characters
Mr Brown/Jeremy Brown, the English teacher in the British show Mind Your Language
Jeremy, also known as Germy, a sickly kid in iCarly
Jeremy, protagonist of Pearl Jam's song "Jeremy"
Jeremy Finch, a character in To Kill a Mockingbird
 Jeremy "Germy" Kidd, in Beverly Cleary's Ramona Forever
Jeremy, a jet airliner in Thomas & Friends
Jeremy Usbourne, in the British series Peep Show
Jeremy Helsey, twin brother of Nicholas from the Pentagram series
Jeremy, in Pure Pwnage
Jeremy Johnson, in Phineas And Ferb
Jeremy Hilary Boob, the "nowhere man" from The Beatles' film, Yellow Submarine
 Jeremy the Crow, a protagonist crow in the book Mrs. Frisby and the Rats of NIMH and adaptations of it
 Jeremy Reed, lead character in Powder
 Jeremy Duncan, protagonist of Zits
 Jeremy Fitzgerald, protagonist of Five Nights at Freddy's 2
 Jeremy, fiancée of Rebecca Devereaux in the Golden Girls
 Jeremy Fisher, the title character of The Tale of Mr. Jeremy Fisher
 Jeremy Fisher, a character in the flash animation series Salad Fingers
 Jeremy, real name of the Scout class in the game Team Fortress 2
 Jeremy Heere, protagonist of Be More Chill
Jeremy the Bear, a Canadian children's TV character based on Les Aventures de Colargol.
Jeremy Belpois, the Code Lyoko's computer genius

Popularity

See also
Jérémy, given name
Jerami Grant (born 1994), American basketball player
Jeremi, given name
Jeremie (name), given name and surname
Jem (given name), a shortened familiar name or nickname for Jeremy
Jer (disambiguation), as above, shortened version of Jeremy
Jez (nickname), a nickname for people named Jeremy

References

English masculine given names